Vindizio Nodari Pesenti (1879–1961) was an Italian painter.

He was born in Medole, in the province of Mantua. He first trained under his uncle the painter Domenico Pesenti, but then traveled to Paris, Venice, and Milan to further his studies. He became friends with the Futurist artists Umberto Boccioni and Carlo Carrà. He painted both external landscapes. The Fondazione Banca Agricola Mantovana has two of his paintings. He also painted interior scenes. He died in Mantua.

References

1879 births
1961 deaths
Artists from the Province of Mantua
Painters from Mantua
20th-century Italian painters
Italian male painters
Italian Futurist painters
20th-century Italian male artists